Juliette Augustina Cavazzi,  (née Sysak; 27 August 1926 – 26 October 2017), nicknamed "Our pet", was a Canadian singer and television host who was featured on CBC Television from the 1950s through the 1970s.

Biography
The daughter of Polish-Ukrainian immigrants, Juliette Augustina Sysak was born in St. Vital, Manitoba. She moved with her family to Vancouver in her youth, where she began her singing career in 1940. She was professionally known by simply her first name, Juliette, starting with her appearances with the Dal Richards band at the Hotel Vancouver at age 13.

Juliette Cavazzi married her manager, singer Tony Ivo Cavazzi on 7 July 1948. They remained married for 40 years until his death in 1988. She retired and lived in Vancouver, although she made occasional special appearances, such as an event marking the 85th birthday of bandleader Dal Richards in 2004.

She died in Vancouver, British Columbia, on 26 October 2017, at the age of 91.

Awards and honours
 1975: appointed Member of the Order of Canada
 1999: inducted into Canada's Walk of Fame
 date unknown: inducted into BC Entertainment Hall of Fame,
 In February 1955, she was selected as Queen of the Saranac Lake, New York winter carnival.

Filmography
 1956–1966: Juliette (CBC Television series)
 1973–1975: Juliette and Friends (CBC Television series)
 8 September 2002: Life and Times biography (CBC Television)

Discography
 1968: Juliette
 1968: Juliette's Christmas World 
 1969: Juliette's Country World

References

External links

 Queen's University Directory of CBC Television Series (Juliette archived listing link via archive.org)
 Queen's University Directory of CBC Television Series (Juliette and Friends archived listing link via archive.org)
CBC News "Your Pet, Juliette"
Canada's Walk of Fame: Juliette Cavazzi
CBC Life and Times: Juliette

 Entry at thecanadianencyclopedia.ca
Dal Richards (official)

1926 births
2017 deaths
Canadian people of Polish descent
Canadian people of Ukrainian descent
Members of the Order of Canada
Musicians from Vancouver
Musicians from Winnipeg
People from St. Vital, Winnipeg
Canadian television variety show hosts
20th-century Canadian women singers